Acacia sulcata is a shrub of the genus Acacia and the subgenus Plurinerves that is endemic to an area of south western Australia.

Description
It has glabrous to minutely hairy branchlets that can be covered in a fine white powdery coating toward the apex. Like most species of Acacia it has phyllodes rather than true leaves. It blooms from June to February and produces yellow flowers. Following flowering thinly leathery to papery seed pods form that are glabrous and sometimes covered in a fine white powdery coating.

Taxonomy
There are three varieties:
 Acacia sulcata var. planoconvexa
 Acacia sulcata var. platyphylla
 Acacia sulcata var. sulcata

Distribution
It is native to an area in the Great Southern, Goldfields-Esperance and Wheatbelt regions of Western Australia where it is commonly situated among granite outcrops, on undulating plains, rocky ridges, rises and hills growing in gravel lateritic, sandy, clay or loamy soils. The range of the plant extends from around Corrigin in the north west to around Albany in the south west and then extending eastward through coastal or near-coastal areas to around Israelite Bay in the east.

See also
 List of Acacia species

References

sulcata
Acacias of Western Australia
Taxa named by Robert Brown (botanist, born 1773)
Plants described in 1813